Svyatoslav Anatoliyovych Syrota (born 1 October 1970) is a Ukrainian sports functionary and former player. Master of Sports of Ukraine (1995).

Biography
At 24 he finished the Ukrainian State University physical fitness and sport. From 1987 to 1998 he played for various clubs such as Dynamo Kyiv, Dnipro Dnipropetrovsk etc. From 2002 to 2004 he worked as the technical secretary for the Kiev municipal Federation of Football. After retiring player career became a football official. In July 2008 Syrota was appointed the executive director of the Professional Football League of Ukraine.

President of Professional Football League
From 2008 to 2010 was the president of the Professional Football League. Syrota was elected on 16 December 2008 at the 3rd report-electoral Conference of PFL in the building of Trade Union Federation of Ukraine. Initially there were six candidates: Ravil Safiullin (president of PFL), Miletiy Balchos, Yuriy Malyshev, Serhiy Mokhnyk, Anatoliy Revutsky, and Svyatoslav Syrota. Eventually three candidates withdrew among which were Ravil Safiullin, Miletiy Balchos, and Anatoliy Revutsky. The conference delegates were left to choose among three remaining candidates. The executive director of PFL Svyatoslav Syrota was elected after he received 39 votes. Mokhnyk received seven votes and Malyshev - one.

During a session of the central council of Professional Football League of Ukraine on 25 November 2009, Syrota was dismissed from performing functions of the league's president until the next report-electoral conference. The central council gave him time until 23 December to explain why there is a suspicion of him mishandling the league's funds. The league's first deputy of president Mykola Lavrenko (the president of PFC Olexandria) became ex officio the league's acting president.

Syrota issue legal proceedings to the Civil Court with a lawsuit on PFL in 2013. Civil Court fully justify legally Syrota and nullify the actions of Professional Football League of Ukraine.

References

External links
 
 Brief biographic overview at PFL web-site 
 Ilchenko, D. "Will answer according to the law". Interview of the former president of PFL of Ukraine. "Sport-Express". 30 November 2009.
 Svyatoslav Syrota: I did not get framed - this is pure fraud. speech of the former president of PFL. 21 January 2010.
 Maksymov, M. The mired in corruption scandals PFL started to get treated by former army physician.. Glavred. 5 March 2010.
 Balchos, M. Appeal of Professional Football League to Football Federation of Ukraine. Professional Football League of Ukraine. 23 April 2010.

1970 births
Living people
Ukrainian footballers
FC Dynamo Kyiv players
FC Dynamo-2 Kyiv players
FC Dnipro players
NK Veres Rivne players
FC Nyva Ternopil players
FC Dustlik players
Association football goalkeepers
Ukrainian expatriate footballers
Expatriate footballers in Russia
Ukrainian expatriate sportspeople in Russia
Expatriate footballers in Uzbekistan
Ukrainian expatriate sportspeople in Uzbekistan
Ukrainian Premier League players
Ukrainian First League players
Professional Football League of Ukraine presidents